Ninite (codenamed Volery during private beta stage) is a package management system offering that enables users to automatically install popular applications for their Windows operating system. It enables users to make a selection from a list of applications and bundles the selection into a single installer package. It is free for personal use. A paid version, Ninite Pro, is available for professional use. Alternatively, a cheaper albeit less robust version of Ninite Pro known as Ninite Updater is available for users who want the ability of one-click updates without the other features offered by Ninite Pro.

Features 
Ninite works on Windows 7 and later. It presents the user with a list of programs and generates a custom installer executable based on the user's selection. When run, the installer downloads and installs the selected programs. Ninite's installer always downloads the latest version of the program. This is accomplished by downloading a regularly-updated list of applications and their download URLs from the Ninite servers each time the program is run. Benefits of using Ninite rather than the individual applications' installers themselves include: toolbar/adware free installations, the ability to update multiple applications at once, automatic selection of architecture (64-bit vs 32-bit), language selection based on operating system's language, and error reporting, should one of the installations fail.

Reception 
Austrian magazine Der Standard wrote, Ninite gets a good basic package of software on the computer. Computerwoche listed Ninite as number 11 of 28 reviewed freeware tools. PC Magazine listed it as a Batch-Installer for software installation at one.

Operation 
On the Ninite webpage, the user chooses software of own preference by activating checkboxes and continues with downloading the executable installer, which is preconfigured to the users custom selection. By executing the installer, the previously chosen software is unattended (without any requested user interaction) installed on the computer.

Supported software 
(as of May 2021)
Web browsers
Chrome, Opera, Firefox, Microsoft Edge

Messaging
Zoom, Discord, Skype, Pidgin, Thunderbird, Trillian

Media
iTunes, VLC, AIMP, foobar2000, Winamp, MusicBee, Audacity, K-Lite Codec Pack, GOM, Spotify, CCCP, MediaMonkey, HandBrake

Runtimes
Java (AdoptOpenJDK) x64 Version 8 and 11, Java (AdoptOpenJDK) 8, .NET Framework, Silverlight

Imaging
Krita, Blender, Paint.NET, GIMP, IrfanView, XnView, Inkscape, FastStone, Greenshot, ShareX

Documents
Foxit Reader, LibreOffice, SumatraPDF, CutePDF, OpenOffice

Security
MS Essentials, Malwarebytes, Avast, AVG, Spybot 2, Avira, SUPERAntiSpyware

File sharing
qBittorrent

Online storage
Dropbox, Google Backup and Sync, OneDrive, SugarSync

Other
Evernote, Google Earth, Steam, KeePass 2, Everything, NV Access

Utilities
TeamViewer 15, ImgBurn, RealVNC, TeraCopy, CDBurnerXP, Revo, Launchy, WinDirStat, Glary, InfraRecorder, Classic Start

Compression
7-Zip, PeaZip, WinRAR

Developer Tools
Python 3 (32 bit and 64 bit available), FileZilla, Notepad++, JDK (AdoptOpenJDK) x64 8 and 11, JDK (AdoptOpenJDK) 8, JDK (Amazon Corretto) x64 8 and 11, JDK (Amazon Corretto) 8, WinSCP, PuTTY, WinMerge, Eclipse, Visual Studio Code

To check current available software version, hover over the software choice on the Ninite website.

Known issues 
The Ninite installer offers discontinued or unmaintained software, and in some cases will only install outdated versions of certain programs.  In some cases this may mean that security issues related to that software will never be addressed.

Microsoft Security Essentials is being discontinued in January 2020 at the same time as Windows 7.  On newer versions of Windows, the same functionality is already installed with the operating system under the feature name of Windows Defender.

Classic Start was discontinued at the end of 2017.

Other applications that have not been updated in over 3 years include:

See also 
 Web Platform Installer
 Binary repository manager
 Chocolatey
 Software repository
 NuGet
 ProGet
 Windows Package Manager

References

External links 
 

Freeware
Installation software
Proprietary package management systems